Paul Lacroix (27 February 1806 – 16 October 1884) was a French author and journalist. He is known best by his pseudonym P.L. Jacob, bibliophile, or Bibliophile Jacob, suggested by his great interest in libraries and books generally.

Biography 
Lacroix was born in Paris, the son of a novelist. He was a prolific and varied writer, composing more than twenty historical romances and a variety of serious historical works, including histories of Napoleon III and of the Czar Nicholas I of Russia.

He was the joint author with Ferdinand Séré of a five-volume work, Le moyen âge et la renaissance (1847), a profusely illustrated standard work on the manners, customs and dress of the Renaissance. He also wrote many monographs on phases of the history of culture, including Manners, Custom and Dress During the Middle Ages and During the Renaissance Period. Someone using the name Pierre Dufour published an exhaustive six-volume Histoire de la prostitution (1851–1854), which has always been attributed to Lacroix. His works concerning bibliography were also numerous, as was his periodical Revue universelle des arts [Universal Review of the Arts], which he initiated in 1855. In 1855 he was appointed librarian of the Arsenal Library, Paris.

He married Apolline Biffe on 7 May 1834. She lived with Paul Lacroix's collaborator, art collector Théophile Thoré-Bürger, for more than a decade until his death.

Works (selection) 

 L’Origine des cartes à jouer, 1835
 L'Homme au Masque de Fer, 1837
 Bibliothèque de M. G. de Pixerécourt, 1838
 Bibliothèque dramatique de M. de Soleinne, 1843-1845
 Bibliothèque dramatique de Pont de Vesle, 1846
 Costumes historiques de la France d’après les monuments les plus authentiques, 1852
 Histoire de la prostitution, 1853
 Œuvres complètes de François Villon, nouvelle édition revue, corrigée et mise en ordre avec des notes historiques et littéraires, par P. L. Jacob, Bibliophile, Paris, P. Jannet, 1854
 Plus romanesque aventure de ma vie, Paris, P. Henneton, 1854 (read on Gallica).
 Ballets et mascarades de Cour, de Henri III à Louis XIV (1581-1652), 1868-1870
 Vie militaire et religieuse au Moyen Âge et à l’époque de la Renaissance, 1869
 Aventures de l’abbé de Choisy habillé en femme, 1870
 Mœurs, usages et costumes au Moyen Âge et à l’époque de la Renaissance, 1871-1877
 Œuvres poétiques de Marc-Claude de Buttet, 2 tomes, in -8, 1880.

English translations published in the United States 
 History of prostitution among all the peoples of the world: from the most remote antiquity to the present day 3. vol. (1926) Translated from the original French (Histoire de la prostitution, 1853) by Samuel Putnam
 Danse Macabre [1832] translated by Brian Stableford, 2013, Black Coat Press,

References

Sources 
 Ferdinand Hoefer, Nouvelle Biographie générale, t. 27, Paris, Firmin-Didot, 1861, (p. 595–8).

External links 
 Paul Lacroix on data.bnf.fr
 
 
 
 
 Works by Paul Lacroix (P.L. Jacob) at openlibrary.org
 Suite de la Convalescence du vieux conteur by P.-L. Jacob, bibliophile on Gallica

Writers from Paris
1806 births
1884 deaths
19th-century French dramatists and playwrights
19th-century French historians
French bibliophiles
French bibliographers
Officiers of the Légion d'honneur